Schoenus nanus is a species of sedge (family Cyperaceae) endemic to Australia, and found in Western Australia, South Australia and Victoria. It was first described in 1844 by Christian Gottfried Daniel Nees von Esenbeck as Chaetospora nana, but in 1878 was transferred by George Bentham to the genus, Schoenus.

In Victoria, this species is listed as "endangered".

Description
Bentham describes the plant as follows:

A more recent description is given by Karen Wilson in 1994.

References

External links
Schoenus nanus occurrence data from the Australasian Virtual Herbarium

nanus
Flora of Western Australia